Pyrola crypta, commonly known as cryptic wintergreen, is a perennial herb in the heath family.

Description
Pyrola crypta resembles other members of the genus Pyrola, particularly Pyrola picta. It can be distinguished from the later by its relatively long sepals (>), longer floral bracts (>), and longer leaf petioles (vs.  in P. picta).

Range
Pyrola crypta is endemic to western North America. It is found in Washington, Oregon, and northern California, in the Olympic Peninsula, the Cascade Range, the Klamath region, and the northern coast of California.

Habitat

Ecology
Like other members of Pyrola, P. crypta has flowers adapted to buzz pollination, and there is some indication that P. crypta reaches anthesis later in the season than other Pyrola species from the same area.

Etymology
The specific epithet, crypta, means "cryptic", referring to the fact that the species is difficult to distinguish morphologically from other members of Pyrola, particularly P. picta.

Taxonomy
Pyrola crypta is a member Pyrola sect. Scotophylla Křísa, which also contains P. picta, P. dentata, and P. aphylla. These taxa together are generally recognized as forming a species complex. Relationships among these taxa are difficult to disentangle, but evidence from chloroplast genetic loci suggest P. crypta is sister to P. dentata, despite its closer morphological similarity to P. picta.

References

External links
Calflora: Pyrola crypta (Cryptic wintergreen)
Jepson Manual (TJM2) treatment of Pyrola crypta

Flora of the Western United States
Flora of Washington (state)
Flora of California
Flora of the Cascade Range
Natural history of the California Coast Ranges
crypta
Flora of Oregon
Flora of the Sierra Nevada (United States)
Flora of the Klamath Mountains
Plants described in 2014
Flora without expected TNC conservation status